Petey Sarron (November 21, 1906 – July 3, 1994) was an American boxer who became a National Boxing Association (NBA) Featherweight Champion on May 11, 1936, defeating Freddie Miller at Griffith Stadium in Washington, D.C. He was inducted into the International Boxing Hall of Fame in 2016.

Dave Evans and Jimmy Erwin worked as managers and promoters. He was best known as a fast, elusive battler, with a windmill attack.

During his career he defeated such opponents as Benny Bass and Frankie Covelli. He lost his World Featherweight Championship to the gifted Henry Armstrong in a sixth-round knockout at Madison Square Garden.

Early life
Pete Sarron was born in Birmingham, Alabama on November 21, 1906. Sarron's parents emigrated to Alabama from Lebanon.  Like many boxers of his era, he made an early living selling newspapers, beginning at age six.  Early in life, he found Dave Evans at the Birmingham Boy's Club who mentored him in boxing, and helped manage his career.  He would return the favor and support the club after becoming a successful boxer.  After High School, he had ambitions to study law and become an attorney.

Amateur and early professional career
Sarron fought future World Flyweight Champion Fidel LaBarba at the age of eighteen in the May 1924 National AAU Flyweight Semi-final and Olympic Trials in Boston. Sarron's performance allowed him to become an alternate for the United States during the 1924 Summer Olympics.  He would meet LaBarba again on April 22, 1932, before a crowd of 2,986 at Olympia Stadium in Detroit, losing the NBA World Featherweight elimination bout in a ten-round decision.  The decision for LaBarba was not popular with the crowd, though he used a stinging left jab to sufficient effect to win the bout in the opinion of referee Slim McClelland. Sarron had trouble evading the jabs of LaBarba though he made a stronger finish in the last two rounds. LaBarba jabbed frequently with his long left, but tired somewhat in the last two rounds, when Sarron made a stand though his punches lacked the authority to do much damage.

Defeating former NBA Flyweight Champion Pinky Silverberg
On May 25, 1929, Sarron defeated Pinky Silverberg, in an important fifteen round points decision in Melbourne, Australia in the featherweight range at 120 pounds.  Silverberg had formerly held the NBA World Flyweight Championship in 1927–8, but had been stripped of the title, and was fighting at the lower featherweight range of 120 with Sarron.

On January 23, 1934, Sarron, at the featherweight range of 128 pounds, met Frankie Covelli at Portner's Arena in Alexandria, Virginia, losing in a ten-round points decision.  On March 8, 1935, however, he beat Covelli at the Coliseum in Coral Gables, Florida in a ten-round points decision. In 1940, Covelli would contend for the NBA World Featherweight Title in Washington D.C.

On June 29, 1934, Sarron defeated former British and Canadian World Lightweight Champion Al Foreman on June 29, 1934, at Griffith Stadium in Washington, D.C.  Sarron had defeated one of his best known opponents in an early win, but it was to be the last professional bout for Foreman, the Jewish Canadian champion who retired to Montreal. Known for his boxing in the America, Foreman had served two years boxing for the US Army in 1924–26, and had been stationed in Virginia.  He continued to fight in the States through 1927, and had fought in Washington D.C. on several previous occasions.

Sarron first met Benny Bass on August 27, 1934, at Griffith Stadium in Washington D.C., winning in a sixth round disqualification. Sarron had a small reach advantage of nearly two inches. He defeated Bass in the next bout on September 24, before 5,000 fans at the Arena in Philadelphia in a ten-round decision. Sarron, who was fouled in the seventh, came back to briefly drop Bass to the floor, and then gain more points in the eighth, reigning a series of blows on the former champion. Sarron took chances with Bass, acting as the aggressor from the start, and boxing a fast-paced bout. In December 1929 Bass had taken the World Jr. Lightweight Title.

Bouts with Freddie Miller, NBA Featherweight Champion
On March 2, 1936, Sarron met Southpaw Freddie Miller at the Coliseum in Coral Gables, Florida losing in a fifteen-round decision. The Referee and one judge scored the fight for Miller with 6 rounds won, 3 tied, and 6 even. Two of the six rounds given to Miller were due to Sarron fouls.

Taking the NBA Featherweight Championship, May 1936
On May 11, 1936, Sarron first took the National Boxing Association World Featherweight championship from Freddie Miller in a fifteen-round points decision at Griffith Stadium, an American League ball park, in Washington D. C. Before an impressive crowd of 23,000, Sarron swarmed over Miller, came up with an early lead in points, and nearly scored knockouts in the thirteen and fifteenth rounds. Sarron had previously lost to Miller three times. The new champion bobbed and weaved expertly, sometimes ducking close to the floor to avoid the blows of Miller, who seemed to have an advantage in the first four rounds. In the ninth through fifteenth, Sarron showed his strongest advantage. Sarron collected the relatively modest sum of $10,000 for his win.

First defense of NBA Featherweight Title
Sarron staged his first defense of the World Featherweight Title on July 22, 1936, winning a fifteen-round unanimous decision against Cuban southpaw Baby Manuel at the Sportatorium in Dallas, Texas. In Texas's first championship bout before a crowd of 4,5000, Sarron, though briefly down in the first, punched his way confidently through for the rest of the match and gained a commanding lead in points and a decisive victory.

Win over British lightweight champion Laurie Stevens
Fighting as a lightweight, on January 16, 1937, Sarron defeated Laurie Stevens in a non-title fight at Wanderer's Stadium in Johannesburg in a twelfth-round knockout.  Stevens had taken the South African Lightweight title in 1933 as well as the British Empire Lightweight Championship in January, 1936, only one year before his meeting with Sarron.  Stevens was also a former British Olympic boxer.

Sarron challenged champion Freddie Miller again on July 31, 1937, in an important ten round non-title bout in Johannesburg, but lost the decision.

Second defense of NBA Featherweight Title
Sarron and Miller fought a fierce rematch in an NBA World Featherweight Championship bout two months later on September 4, 1937, before a crowd of 25,000 in Johannesburg and Sarron won a majority decision.  Sarron floored Miller twice for a decisive victory.  Miller was floored for a count of seven in the sixth round from a left cross by Sarron.  In the twelfth, Sarron scored a knockdown with a hard right for a count of three.

Losing the NBA Featherweight Championship, October 1937
Sarron lost his title to the exceptional black boxing champion Henry Armstrong in a sixth-round knockout on October 29, 1937, before a crowd of 11,847 at Madison Square Garden. Several sources reported it was Sarron's first knockout in twelve years of fighting. Sarron looked in control in the first, but by the second round had been staggered by the blows of Armstrong, who would have won the third but for a low blow dealt to Sarron.  Sarron managed to remain even in the fourth but by the fifth was again badly staggered by a blow from Armstrong, who had no trouble ending the bout in the sixth with a left hook to the chin of Sarron who tried vainly to cover with his gloves. The following year the incomparable Armstrong took both the World Welterweight and World Lightweight Championships.

Sarron retired from boxing on July 17, 1939, after losing his last bout, a ten-round points decision against Sammy Angott at Forbes Field in Pittsburgh, Pennsylvania.

Life after boxing
During his life, Sarron enjoyed reading golfing, and fishing, and had ambitions to become an attorney and study law.  He was studious and articulate for a young man who chose boxing as a profession.

In late 1953, he became the Secretary of the Miami Boxing Commission. He married Patrinilla "Pat" Farah, who was also of Lebanese/Syrian descent. The couple had two boys, Peter and Ronald. Throughout his life, Sarron maintained a very close relationship with his family. During the 1960s, Sarron worked as an enforcement agent for the Florida Beverage Department, enforcing state and federal tobacco laws. He eventually retired in Miami and died there at age 87 on July 3, 1994.

Achievements and honors
Sarron was featured on the cover of the November 1936 The Ring magazine.

He was an inductee into the 2016 International Boxing Hall of Fame.

Professional boxing record
All information in this section is derived from BoxRec, unless otherwise stated.

Official record

All newspaper decisions are officially regarded as “no decision” bouts and are not counted in the win/loss/draw column.

Unofficial record

Record with the inclusion of newspaper decisions in the win/loss/draw column.

See also
List of featherweight boxing champions

References

External links
 

1906 births
1994 deaths
Featherweight boxers
World featherweight boxing champions
Boxers at the 1924 Summer Olympics
American people of Lebanese descent
Olympic boxers of the United States
Sportspeople from Birmingham, Alabama
Boxers from Alabama
American male boxers
Sportspeople of Lebanese descent